Bourne Woods are situated near Bourne, Lincolnshire, England, and includes Bourne Wood and Fox Wood.  

Bourne Wood (National Grid reference TF0821; Co-ordinates: O°24'W, 52°46'N) and Fox Wood are owned by The Forestry Commission and managed by Forest Enterprise (England) as part of Kesteven Forest.

References

Web
 A history of the Forestry Commission, owner of Bourne Wood but not of those nearby (except Fox Wood).
 A history of British forestry.
 Wildlife in Bourne Wood.
 Dole Wood, Thurlby.

Paper
 Ordnance Survey 1:25 000 First Series, Sheet TF02 (Edenham). 1955.
 Institute of Geological Sciences. One-Inch Series, Sheet 143 Drift Edition (Bourne). 1967.
 Morgan, P. & Thorn, C. ed. Domesday Book, volume 31, Lincolnshire Parts one and two.
 Bevis, T. ed. Hereward and De Gestis Herwardi Saxonis. In English with commentary. Westrydale Press. 1981. . (The Peterborough Hereward Story: original text directly translated.)
 Platts, G. Land and People in Medieval Lincolnshire. Chapter 4. History of Lincolnshire Vol. 4. History of Lincolnshire Committee, Lincoln. 1985. . (Medieval agriculture and forestry in a parish near Bourne.)
 Benn, D.I. and Evans, D.J.A.  Glaciers and Glaciation. Arnold. Paragraph 3.2.4.4. (Proglacial Lakes)
 Venables, E. Bourne, its Castle and its Abbey. Lincs & Notts Architectural and Archaeological Society. Vol. XX, 1889. Cited by Birkbeck, J. D. in A History of Bourne. Lanes. Bourne. 1970. (Endowment of Bourne Abbey)
Backhouse, J. The Luttrell Psalter. The British Library. 1989. . (depictions of C14 field work.)
Field, J. Learning Through Labour: Training, unemployment and the state, 1890-1939, University of Leeds. 1992.  (work camps)
(FNQ), Miller, S.H. transcriber, and Sweeting, W.D. translator, The Exploits of Hereward the Saxon, a serial supplement in Fenland Notes and Queries (1895-7)

External links
 Friends of Bourne Wood. Detailed maps, walks and history of Bourne Wood.

Forests and woodlands of Lincolnshire
Bourne, Lincolnshire